(born November 18, 1966 in Shizuoka Prefecture) is a Japanese video game designer and director. Takahashi worked at Square (now Square Enix), in the 90s as a graphic designer and director, participating on some of their most well-received titles such as Final Fantasy V, Final Fantasy VI and Chrono Trigger. In 1999, he left Square to co-found Monolith Soft, Inc., where he would produce the Xenogears (Square), Xenosaga (Monolith Soft/Namco) and Xenoblade Chronicles (Monolith Soft/Nintendo) series, his most notable works. He is married to Soraya Saga, who also worked with him at Square Enix, as well as on Xenogears, Xenosaga, and Soma Bringer.

Biography
Takahashi was born on November 18, 1966 in Shizuoka Prefecture, Japan. He began his career in video games in the 1980s working with Nihon Falcom.

Squaresoft
Takahashi worked on Final Fantasy VI, including the design of the Magitek armor from the opening scene of the game. He also was the graphics director on Chrono Trigger.

In 1995 he married his Squaresoft coworker Kaori Tanaka, better known by her pen name Soraya Saga.

Xenogears
Originally submitted as a potential plot for Final Fantasy VII, it was made into its own project after being judged too dark and complicated for a fantasy game by others at Squaresoft.

Monolith Soft
While at Squaresoft, Takahashi realized that the company intended to focus on the Final Fantasy series, and that sequels to the Xenogears series were becoming unlikely. He then decided to leave and start his own software development company. In October 1999 he left Squaresoft to start a new company, Monolith Soft, together with Hirohide Sugiura.

Xenoblade Chronicles
Following a meeting about the game Soma Bringer, Takahashi imagined what a game would be like where the world was actually the body of a "giant god". Takahashi attempted a more "mature" writing style for the game, and said he expects to continue in the same vein in the future. The game references both Japanese and Western RPG styles, referring to the western style in some cases "without thinking about it". In this way, the game is designed to appeal to fans of "text-based" JRPGs and western RPGs at the same time. Minor localizations were made for the American and European release, as well as bug fixes and game balancing. Originally Takahashi tried a more traditional turned based combat system, but he later incorporated a battle system where the protagonist can see into the future as a gameplay mechanic.

Xenoblade Chronicles X
Takahashi and Monolith Soft were revealed to be working on a new game for the Wii U in September 2012.
It was later revealed in the January 2013 Nintendo Direct under the tentative title X, and shown further at E3 2013. For E3 2014, it was announced with the title Xenoblade Chronicles X.

Video games

References

External links
Tetsuya Takahashi profile at MobyGames
高橋 哲哉 involvements at PukiWiki

Japanese writers
Japanese video game designers
Japanese video game directors
Final Fantasy designers
1966 births
Living people
People from Shizuoka Prefecture
Square Enix people